The 2003 Paris–Nice was the 61st edition of the Paris–Nice cycle race and was held from 9 March to 16 March 2003. The race started in Issy-les-Moulineaux and finished in Nice. The race was won by Alexander Vinokourov of the Telekom team.

Andrey Kivilev, fourth in the 2001 Tour de France, crashed heavily during stage 2. He was taken to hospital with severe head injuries and placed in a coma. An emergency surgery was conducted the same night, but Kivilev died in the early morning of 12 March 2003. Following his death, calls to make the wearing of crash helmets compulsory in professional cycling increased. Less than a month later, the sport's governing body, the Union Cycliste Internationale, declared helmets mandatory for all UCI-sanctioned events.

General classification

References

2003
2003 in road cycling
2003 in French sport
March 2003 sports events in France